John Slagg (junior) (24 Oct 1837 – 7 May 1889) was a British businessman and Liberal politician.

He was the eldest son of John Slagg, a justice of the peace at Manchester, and his wife Jane née Crighton. John Slagg senior was a commission agent and merchant in the city. His friend, Anti Corn Law campaigner Richard Cobden was his son's godfather.

Slagg followed his father into business, and became president of the Manchester Chamber of Commerce. In 1885 he was appointed as a director of the Suez Canal Company. He made his home at Hopefield, Pendleton.

In 1880 he was elected as one of Manchester's three members of parliament. The Redistribution of Seats Act 1885 divided the Manchester constituency into six divisions, and Slagg stood as the Liberal candidate at Manchester North West, but was defeated. He returned to the Commons at a bi-election in 1887 at Burnley.

In 1866 he married Katherine German of Sevenoaks, Kent.

John Slagg died at his Mayfair, London home in May 1889, aged 51.

References

External links 
 
 

1837 births
1889 deaths
Liberal Party (UK) MPs for English constituencies
UK MPs 1880–1885
Politics of Burnley
UK MPs 1886–1892
Members of the Parliament of the United Kingdom for Manchester